African War may refer to:

 Hispano-Moroccan War (1859–60), fought between Spain and Morocco from October 1859 until April 1860
 a phase of Caesar's Civil War, see Caesar's Civil War#African campaign
 De Bello Africo, Caesar's account of the African War
 Several of the wars in list of conflicts in Africa